William Stoney (9 May 1898 – 16 February 1980) was a British swimmer. He competed in the men's 200 metre breaststroke event at both the 1920 Summer Olympics and the 1924 Summer Olympics.

References

External links
 

1898 births
1980 deaths
British male swimmers
British male breaststroke swimmers
Olympic swimmers of Great Britain
Swimmers at the 1920 Summer Olympics
Swimmers at the 1924 Summer Olympics
People from Pateley Bridge
20th-century British people